Léon: The Professional, titled Leon in the United Kingdom (and originally titled The Professional in the United States), is a 1994 English-language French action-thriller film written and directed by Luc Besson. It stars Jean Reno and Gary Oldman, and features the film debut of Natalie Portman. The plot centers on Léon (Reno), a professional hitman who reluctantly takes in twelve-year-old Mathilda Lando (Portman) after her family is murdered by corrupt Drug Enforcement Administration agent Norman Stansfield (Oldman). Léon and Mathilda form an unusual relationship, as she becomes his protégée and learns the hitman's trade.

Plot
Léon is an Italian hitman (or "cleaner", as he refers to himself) in the Little Italy neighborhood of New York City working for a mafioso named "Old Tony". One day, Léon meets Mathilda Lando, a lonely twelve-year-old who lives with her dysfunctional family in an apartment down the hall from Léon, and has stopped attending class at her school for troubled girls. Mathilda's abusive father attracts the ire of corrupt DEA agents, who have been paying him to stash cocaine in his apartment. After they discover that he has been stealing the cocaine, DEA agents storm the building, led by their boss, the sharply dressed drug-addict Norman Stansfield. During the raid, Stansfield murders Mathilda's family while she is out shopping for groceries. When she returns, Mathilda realizes what has happened just in time to continue down the hall to Léon's apartment; he hesitantly gives her shelter.

Mathilda quickly discovers that Léon is a hitman. She begs him to take care of her and to teach her his skills, as she wants to avenge the murder of her four-year-old brother. At first, Léon is unsettled by her presence and considers murdering her in her sleep but he eventually trains Mathilda and shows her how to use various weapons. In exchange, she runs his errands, cleans his apartment and teaches him how to read. Mathilda looks up to Léon and quickly develops a crush on him, often telling him she loves him but he does not reciprocate.

When Léon is out on a job, Mathilda fills a bag with guns from Léon's collection and sets out to kill Stansfield. She bluffs her way into the DEA office by posing as a delivery girl, and is ambushed by Stansfield in a bathroom. One of his men arrives and informs him that Léon killed Malky, one of the corrupt DEA agents, in Chinatown that morning. Léon, after discovering her plan in a note left for him, rescues Mathilda, killing two more of Stansfield's men in the process. An enraged Stansfield confronts Tony, who is tortured for Léon's whereabouts.

Léon tells Mathilda about how he became a hitman. When Léon was eighteen in Italy, he fell  in love with a girl from a wealthy family, but Léon was from a poor family. The two made plans to elope but when the girl's father discovered their plans, he killed her out of anger. Léon killed the father in revenge and fled to New York, where he met Tony and trained to become a hitman.

Later, while Mathilda returns home from grocery shopping, an NYPD ESU team sent by Stansfield captures her and infiltrates Léon's apartment. Léon ambushes the ESU team and rescues Mathilda. Léon creates a quick escape for Mathilda by smashing a hole in an air shaft. He tells her that he loves her and to meet him at Tony's place in an hour, moments before the ESU team blow up the apartment. In the chaos, a wounded Léon sneaks out of the building disguised as a wounded ESU officer. He goes unnoticed by everyone except Stansfield, who follows him and shoots him in the back. As Léon dies, he presses a grenade pin in Stansfield's palm, saying that it is from Mathilda. Stansfield opens Léon's vest to find a cluster of grenades, which detonate, killing Stansfield.

Mathilda goes to Tony and tries to convince Tony to hire her but Tony flatly refuses to hire a twelve-year-old and tells Mathilda that Léon told him to give his money to her if anything happened to him. He gives Mathilda $100 as an allowance and sends her back to school, where the headmistress re-admits her after Mathilda reveals what has happened. Mathilda walks onto a field near the school to plant Léon's houseplant, as she had told Léon, to "give it roots".

Cast

Production

Léon: The Professional is to some extent an expansion of an idea in Besson's earlier 1990 film, La Femme Nikita (in some countries Nikita). In La Femme Nikita, Jean Reno plays a similar character named Victor. Besson described Léon as "Now maybe Jean is playing the American cousin of Victor. This time he's more human."  Maïwenn, Besson's wife at the time of filming, says the film was inspired by their relationship; Besson met Maïwenn when she was 12, and they started dating when she was 15.

While most of the interior footage was shot in France, the rest of the film was shot on location in New York City. The final scene at school was filmed at Stevens Institute of Technology in Hoboken, New Jersey.

Soundtrack
A soundtrack for the film was released in October 1994 by TriStar Music. It was commercially successful in Japan, being certified gold for 100,000 copies shipped in December 1999.

Release
Léon: The Professional was released in France on 14 September 1994. The film was a commercial success, grossing over $45 million worldwide on a $16 million budget. It grossed 26.8 million French Franc ($5.1 million) in its opening week in France and was number one for three weeks. In France, it sold 3,330,703 tickets in total.

Reception

Critical response
On Rotten Tomatoes the film holds an approval rating of 74% based on 65 reviews, with an average rating of 6.9/10. The site's critics consensus reads, "Pivoting on the unusual relationship between seasoned hitman and his 12-year-old apprentice—a breakout turn by young Natalie Portman—Luc Besson's Léon is a stylish and oddly affecting thriller." At Metacritic, the film received an average score of 64 out of 100 based on 12 critics, indicating "generally favorable reviews". Audiences polled by CinemaScore gave the film an average grade of "B" on an A+ to F scale.

Mark Salisbury of Empire magazine awarded the film a full five stars. He said, "Oozing style, wit and confidence from every sprocket, and offering a dizzyingly, fresh perspective on the Big Apple that only Besson could bring, this is, in a word, wonderful". Mark Deming at AllMovie awarded the film four stars out of five, describing it as "As visually stylish as it is graphically violent", and featuring "a strong performance from Jean Reno, a striking debut by Natalie Portman, and a love-it-or-hate-it, over-the-top turn by Gary Oldman". 

Richard Schickel of Time magazine lauded the film, writing, "this is a Cuisinart of a movie, mixing familiar yet disparate ingredients, making something odd, possibly distasteful, undeniably arresting out of them". He praised Oldman's performance as "divinely psychotic".

Roger Ebert awarded the film two-and-a-half stars out of four, writing: "It is a well-directed film, because Besson has a natural gift for plunging into drama with a charged-up visual style. And it is well acted." However, he was not entirely complimentary: "Always at the back of my mind was the troubled thought that there was something wrong about placing a 12-year-old character in the middle of this action. ... In what is essentially an exercise—a slick urban thriller—it seems to exploit the youth of the girl without really dealing with it."

The New York Times Janet Maslin wrote, "The Professional is much too sentimental to sound shockingly amoral in the least. Even in a finale of extravagant violence, it manages to be maudlin ... Mr. Oldman expresses most of the film's sadism as well as many of its misguidedly poetic sentiments."

Year-end lists
 Honorable mention – Betsy Pickle, Knoxville News-Sentinel

Legacy
In the 2013 book, Poseur: A Memoir of Downtown New York City in the '90s, Marc Spitz wrote that the film is "considered a cult classic". In 2014, Time Out polled several film critics, directors, actors and stunt actors to list their top action films; Léon: The Professional was listed at No. 42. The character Norman Stansfield has since been named as one of cinema's greatest villains.

The English band Alt-J released a song about the film, titled "Matilda" [sic]. The first line in the lyrics, "this is from Matilda", refers to Léon's last words to Stansfield, shortly before the grenades detonate and kill them.

South Korean comedian Park Myeong-su and singer-songwriter IU released and performed a song inspired by the film, "Leon", for a bi-annual music festival of South Korea's highly popular variety show, Infinite Challenge, in 2015.

Sequel

Besson wrote a script for a sequel, Mathilda, but filming was delayed until Portman was older. In the script, Mathilda was described as "older" and "more mature", and was working as a cleaner. However, in the meantime, Besson left Gaumont Film Company to start his own movie studio, EuropaCorp. Unhappy at Besson's departure, Gaumont Film Company "has held The Professional rights close to the vest – and will not budge".

In 2011, director Olivier Megaton told reporters that he and Besson used the script for Mathilda as the basis for Colombiana, a film about a young cleaner played by Zoe Saldaña. Like Mathilda, her character goes to war with a drug cartel as revenge for the murder of her family when she was a child.

Extended version
There is also an extended version of the film, referred to as "international version", "version longue", or "version intégrale". Containing 25 minutes of additional footage, it is sometimes called the "Director's Cut" but Besson refers to the original version as the Director's Cut and the new version as "The Long Version". 

According to Besson, this is the version he wanted to release, but for the fact that the extra scenes tested poorly with Los Angeles preview audiences. The additional material is found in the film's second act, and it depicts more of the interactions and relationship between Léon and Mathilda, as well as explicitly demonstrating how Mathilda accompanies Léon on several of his hits as "a full co-conspirator", to further her training as a contract killer.

References

External links

 
 
 
 

1994 films
1994 action films
1994 action thriller films
1990s English-language films
Czech Lion Awards winners (films)
English-language French films
Fiction about familicide
Films about teenagers
Films about the American Mafia
Films about contract killing in the United States
Films about corruption in the United States
Films about the Drug Enforcement Administration
Films about the New York City Police Department
Films about orphans
Films directed by Luc Besson
Films scored by Éric Serra
Films set in apartment buildings
Films set in Manhattan
Films set in New Jersey
Films shot in New Jersey
Films shot in New York City
Films with screenplays by Luc Besson
French action thriller films
French films about revenge
Gaumont Film Company films
Juvenile sexuality in films
1990s French films
Foreign films set in the United States